Lee Jung-iI (born November 4, 1956) is a Korean football forward who played for South Korea in the 1980 Asian Cup. He also played for Commercial Bank of Korea FC.

International Record

References

External links

South Korean footballers
South Korea international footballers
1956 births
Living people
Korea University alumni
Association football forwards
1980 AFC Asian Cup players